Ahammad Uddin Shah Shishu Niketon School & College is a non-government educational institution in Gaibandha, Bangladesh that was established in 1982.

History 
To keep peace with the modern system of scientific education some education-loving elite of Gaibandha Town started ‘Shishu Niketan, Gaibandha’ a Kindergarten type school in the local Mahila College (now govt.) on January 24, 1982.

Later on Shahjada Anwarul Qadir, a member of the School Managing Committee, donated a piece of land on Godown Road; the school was transferred there in 1985. In the same year ‘Ahammad Uddin Shah Shishu Niketan Trust’ was formed. In recognition of the donation, the school was renamed as ‘Ahammad Uddin Shah Shishu Niketan’.
 
The school was gradually upgraded to Junior, Secondary and Higher Secondary level in 1994, 1999, and 2002 respectively after which the school became ‘Ahammad Uddin Shah Shishu Niketan School and College.’

Campus 
The institution has three multistoried buildings. One is used for Primary School activities, one for Secondary School activities, and the other building is used for college activities.

Gallery

References

External links 
 

Schools in Gaibandha District
Colleges in Gaibandha District
Educational institutions established in 1982
1982 establishments in Bangladesh